Indira Gandhi Chawk or  Narayan Bapu Nagar Chawk is a road junction and public space of Nashik's Nashik Road, built in 2003 to connect Jail Road (SH26) with the major shopping area Nashik Road. Indira Gandhi was the first female Prime Minister of Republic of India, This circle was open to public in 2003 with the help of Vilasrao Deshmukh, Chief Minister of Maharashtra.

The Indira Gandhi Statue now links directly to the theatres on Nashik-Pune Road National Highway 50, as well as shopping malls, and highwaysin Nashik city. The Circle is close to major shopping and entertainment areas in the West End. Its status as a major traffic intersection has made Indira Gandhi Chawk a busy meeting place and a tourist attraction in its own right.

Notable people

Dinkar Gotiram Adhav
Karbhari Adhav
Frank Pinto
Nishant Gatkal
Aakash Adhav
Sampat Kachru Kadam
Dr. Devendra Yeole
Manish Yerawar
Deepesh Joshi
Niraj Kulkarni

References

Nashik
Road junctions in India